Kemin Into, is a Finnish sports club based in the town of Kemi. Founded in 1907, they have sections in gymnastics, wrestling, boxing, bowling and basketball. Club owns a campsite in 8 km south of Kemi. Kemin Into is a member club of Finnish Workers' Sports Federation

Football
In 1970 Kemin Into was a first club from Lapland to reach Finnish first tier, known as mestaruussarja at the time. They were relegated after a single season. In 1985 they merged with two other local TUL Clubs to form Kemin Pallotoverit(KPT-85). They played their last season in 1985.

Season to season

References

External links
 Official Website 
Finnish Wikipedia

Sports clubs in Finland
1907 establishments in Finland
Kemi